Jan Feiko Kloppenburg (born 19 June 1974) is a former Dutch international cricketer. He was born in Haarlem, North Holland.

Domestic career
Kloppenburg made his first-class cricket debut in the 2004 ICC Intercontinental Cup game against Ireland at Deventer. He had a match to forget, bagging a pair with the bat and conceding 60 runs from 12 wicketless overs.

International career
Kloppenburg toured England with a Netherlands A side in 1995, but his first tournament of note for his country was the 1998 European Championships, held that year in his home country. He scored only 40 runs in four innings, and took just two wickets, but was part of the side that defeated Denmark in the final at The Hague. He appeared in six of the Netherlands' ten games in the 2001 ICC Trophy, but scored only one half-century and had been dropped by the time the Dutch team beat Namibia in the final.

He made his One Day International debut in September 2002, at the ICC Champions Trophy tournament. He played only one match in this competition, opening the batting against Pakistan but scoring just 7 before being run out by Shahid Afridi. He also took the only Pakistani wicket to fall, that of Imran Nazir. Five months later he played a fuller part in the Netherlands' 2003 World Cup squad, with five appearances in the competition.

Against Namibia he made 121 to become the first Dutch cricketer to score an ODI century, just ahead of team-mate Klaas-Jan van Noortwijk who also passed three figures in the match and with whom he put on 228 for the second wicket, a Dutch record for any wicket in ODIs. Kloppenburg then completed a fine all-round performance by claiming 4/42 with the ball, making him only the sixth player to score a hundred and take four wickets in the same ODI. He adjudged man of the match for his performance as well.

References

External links
 

1974 births
Living people
Dutch cricketers
Netherlands One Day International cricketers
Sportspeople from Haarlem